Aleksandr Evgenyevich Nepomnyashchiy (February 16, 1968 – April 20, 2007) was a Russian poet, singer and bard, as well as a member of the National Bolshevik Party. He was born in Kovrov and died, aged 39,  in Ivanovo.

References

External links
 Aleksandr  Nepomnyashchiy - official website

1984 births
2007 deaths
People from Kovrov
National Bolshevik Party politicians
Russian bards
Russian male poets
Russian rock musicians
20th-century Russian singers
20th-century Russian male singers